"Been Caught Stealing" is a song by American rock band Jane's Addiction, released in November 1990 as the third single from their second album, Ritual de lo Habitual (1990). Different versions appear on the compilations Kettle Whistle, Up from the Catacombs – The Best of Jane's Addiction and Rev.

Among its highlights are what Rolling Stone dubbed "the best use of dog barks since Pet Sounds". "That was Annie", recalled singer Perry Farrell. "I'd got her from a dog shelter and she was quite needy, so I brought her down to the studio that day rather than leave her at home… I'm singing in the booth with the headphones on and Annie gets all excited and starts going, 'Ruff! Ruff! Ruff!'… The fact that she ended up on the track was just pure coincidence."

Critical reception
Greg Prato from AllMusic declared the song as a "cheerful ditty". J.D. Considine from The Baltimore Sun found that "the loping groove and whirlpool guitars" of songs like "Been Caught Stealing", "are enough to suggest that Jane's Addiction may yet rewrite the book on hard rock." Larry Flick from Billboard wrote, "After a long and impressive reign at modern rock radio, cut from acclaimed band's current set is well-poised to click at top 40. Trippy psychedelic rave-fueled with nifty acoustic and electric guitar trade-offs-kicks hard but doesn't risk intimidating weak-atheart mainstreamers." The Daily Vault's Christopher Thelen stated that this is "the song that will probably define Jane's Addiction for the remainder of time." 

Simon Reynolds from Melody Maker said it, "by some uncanny and presumably innocent coincidence, hits upon a near-identical groove to Happy Mondays' "Wrote for Luck": its funk undercarriage is almost baggy." John Lannert from Sun Sentinel described the song as "psychedelic hip-hop". Craig S. Semon from Telegram & Gazette named it the "standout" of the album and "rock 'n' roll's definitive pro-shoplifting song." He added, "From its inspired use of dogs barking and hands clapping, this song is a gem. Farrell's commanding vocals, Navarro's choppy rhythms and the song's engaging brassiness creates a strong interplay for this truly distorted vision. The lines "When we want something, we don't want to pay for it. We walk right through the door", emphasises this offbeat bohemian view of survival."

Music video
The song's accompanying music video humorously depicted people (including the band members) shoplifting at a grocery store. Directed by Farrell's girlfriend Casey Niccoli, it was voted  on VH1's 100 Greatest Videos.

Awards and accolades
The song is featured on The Rock and Roll Hall of Fame's 500 Songs that Shaped Rock and Roll (the list has no particular ranking).

It was chosen by Alice Cooper as one of his eight selections on the UK radio program Desert Island Discs.

The music video won Best Alternative Video at the 1991 MTV Video Music Awards. It also won the 1991 Foundations Forum Award for Best Video (Single Cut), tying with Slayer's "Seasons in the Abyss."

Track listing

Charts

See also
Number one modern rock hits of 1990

References

1990 singles
Jane's Addiction songs
Music videos directed by Jonathan Dayton and Valerie Faris
Songs about crime
Songs written by Perry Farrell
Songs written by Eric Avery
Warner Records singles
1990 songs